Muffat is a surname. Notable people with the surname include:

Camille Muffat (1989–2015), French swimmer
Georg Muffat (1653–1704), Baroque composer and organist
Gottlieb Muffat (1690–1770), Austrian baroque composer, son of Georg Muffat

See also
Moffat (surname)